Yodpayak Sitsongpeenong (Thai: ยอดพยัคฆ์ ศิษย์สองพี่น้อง, ; born February 25, 1993) is a Thai Muay Thai kickboxer. As of June 2016, he is ranked the #3 Middleweight by Rajadamnern Stadium, #3 Super Welterweight by Thailand PAT, and #5 Super Welterweight by World Boxing Council Muaythai.

Biography and career
Yodpayak Sitsongpeenong was born as Woranat Ponnikom in Maha Sarakham in Northeastern (Isan) region of Thailand on February 25, 1993. He had his first fight at the age of 11 in 2004.

On 11 January, he won against Jaenrop Pumphanmuang via third-round technical knock out in a bout at 159 lb.

On 26 July 2014, he beat Peemai Jitmuangnon in a five-round decision to win the vacant Omnoi Stadium super welterweight title at 154 lb.

On 18 July 2015, he defended his Omnoi Stadium title against Fahmongkol SJ Danrayong.

On 20 October 2015, he fought Sirimongkol Sitanupap for both the vacant Thailand PAT super welterweight title and for the vacant Lumpinee Stadium super welterweight title, but loss to a five-round decision.

On 16 February 2016, he fought Sirimongkol  Sitniwatfor the Lumpinee Stadium super welterweight title and won after a five-round decision.

On 28, May, 2016, he fought Denpanom RR Keela Korat to defend his Omnoi Stadium title, but was not successful.

Titles and achievements

 2016 Lumpinee Stadium Super Welterweight Champion (154 lb)
 2014 Omnoi Stadium Super Welterweight Champion (154 lb), former

Muay Thai record

|-  style="background:#fbb;"
| 2018-05-20 || Win ||align=left| Ilya Grad || Real Hero Muay Thai || Bangkok, Thailand || Decision || 1 || 5:00
|-  style="background:#cfc;"
| 2018-05-20 || Win ||align=left| Thiago Goulate || Real Hero Muay Thai || Bangkok, Thailand || Decision || 1 || 5:00
|-  style="background:#fbb;"
| 2018-01-26 || Loss||align=left| Sorgraw Petchyindee || True4U Muaymanwansuk, Rangsit Stadium || Thailand || Decision || 5 || 3:00
|-  style="background:#fbb;"
| 2017-08-07 || Loss ||align=left| Youssef Boughanem || Sor.Sommai Fight, Rajadamnern Stadium || Bangkok, Thailand || KO || 5 || 
|-
! style=background:white colspan=9 |
|-  style="background:#fbb;"
| 2017-04-21 || Loss ||align=left| Rafael Fiziev || MX MUAY XTREME || Bangkok, Thailand || KO (Right Cross) || 2 ||
|-  style="background:#cfc;"
| 2017-03-17 || Win ||align=left| Lang Ting Gui || MX MUAY XTREME || Bangkok, Thailand || KO (Right Elbow) || 1 || 0:26
|-  style="background:#cfc;"
| 2017-01-27 || Win ||align=left| James Heelan || MX MUAY XTREME || Bangkok, Thailand || KO (Right Elbow) || 2 ||
|-  style="background:#cfc;"
| 2016-12-23 || Win ||align=left| Farsura Windysport || Sangmorakot Fight, Lumpinee Stadium || Bangkok, Thailand || Decision || 5 || 3:00
|-
! style=background:white colspan=9 | 
|-  style="background:#fbb;"
| 2016-08-27 || Win ||align=left| Mogomed Zaykunov || EM Legend 14 || Chengdu, China || TKO || 2 || 
|-  style="background:#fbb;"
| 2016-09-17 || Loss ||align=left| Jimmy Vienot || Wicked One Duel || Paris, France || Decision || 5 || 3:00 
|-  style="background:#cfc;"
| 2016-08-27 || Win ||align=left| Ievgenii Kurovskoy || Topking World Series || Chengdu, China || Decision || 3 || 3:00
|-  style="background:#cfc;"
| 2016-07-09 || Win ||align=left| Jose Neto || EM Legend 10 || Chengdu, China || KO || 1 || 
|-  style="background:#fbb;"
| 2016-05-28 || Lost ||align=left| Denpanom RR Keela Korat || Omnoi Stadium || Bangkok, Thailand || Decision || 5 || 3:00
|-
! style=background:white colspan=9 | 
|-  style="background:#cfc;"
| 2016-03-27 || Win ||align=left| Gladstone Martin Allen || Workpoint Super Muaythai || Bangkok, Thailand || Decision || 3 || 3:00
|-  style="background:#cfc;"
| 2016-03-12 || Win ||align=left| Mogomed Zaynukov || Workpoint Super Muaythai || Bangkok, Thailand || Decision || 3 || 3:00 
|-  style="background:#cfc;"
| 2016-02-16 || Win ||align=left| Sirimongkol Sitniwat || Sangmorakot Fight, Lumpinee Stadium || Bangkok, Thailand || Decision || 5 || 3:00
|-
! style=background:white colspan=9 |
|-  style="background:#cfc;"
| 2016-01-24 || Win ||align=left| Mogomed Zaynukov || Workpoint Super Muaythai || Bangkok, Thailand || Decision || 3 || 3:00 
|-  style="background:#fbb;"
| 2015-10-20 || Loss ||align=left| Sirimongkol Sitanupap || Sangmorakot Fight, Lumpinee Stadium || Bangkok, Thailand || Decision || 5 || 3:00
|-
! style=background:white colspan=9 |
|-  style="background:#fbb;"
| 2015-09-20 || Loss ||align=left| Vladamir Konsky || Top King World Series || Vientiane, Laos ||  Decision || 3 || 3:00 
|- style="background:#cfc;"
| 2015-07-18 || Win ||align=left| Fahmongkol SJ Danrayong || Omnoi Stadium || Bangkok, Thailand ||  Decision   || 5 || 3:00
|-
! style=background:white colspan=9 | 
|-  style="background:#fbb;"
| 2015-04-04 || Loss ||align=left| Sirimongkol Sitanupap || Omnoi Stadium || Thailand || Decision || 5 || 3:00
|-  style="background:#cfc;"
| 2015-02-28 || Win ||align=left| Teedet Sitjakoong || Omnoi Stadium || Thailand || KO || 3 || 
|-  style="background:#cfc;"
| 2015-01-24 || Win ||align=left| Tengnueng Sitjaesairoong || Omnoi Stadium || Thailand || Decision || 5 || 3:00
|-  style="background:#fbb;"
| 2014-11-11 || Lost ||align=left| Sirimongkol Sitanupap || Omnoi Stadium || Thailand ||  Decision || 5 || 3:00
|-  style="background:#c5d2ea;"
| 2014-08-30 || Draw ||align=left| Dejrit Poptheeratham || Omnoi Stadium || Thailand ||  Decision || 5 || 3:00
|-  style="background:#cfc;"
| 2014-07-26 || Win || style="text-align:left;"| Peemai Jitmuangnon  || Omnoi Stadium || Bangkok, Thailand || Decision || 5 || 3:00 
|-
! style=background:white colspan=9 |
|-  style="background:#fbb;"
| 2014-06-14 || Lost || style="text-align:left;"| Samy Sana || Best of Siam 5 || Paris, France || Decision || 5 || 3:00 
|-  style="background:#cfc;"
| 2014-04-12 || Win ||align=left| Thepsutin Pumphanmuang || Omnoi Stadium || Thailand || Decision || 5 || 3:00
|-  style="background:#cfc;"
| 2014-03-15 || Win || style="text-align:left;"| Charnchai Sitithisukato || Omnoi Stadium || Thailand || Decision || 5 || 3:00
|-  style="background:#fbb;"
| 2014-02-08 || Lost || style="text-align:left;"| Eakchanachai Kaewsamrit || Omnoi Stadium || Thailand || Decision || 5 || 3:00
|-  style="background:#cfc;"
| 2014-01-11 || Win || style="text-align:left;"| Jaenrop Pumphanmuang  || Omnoi Stadium || Thailand || TKO || 3 || 
|-  style="background:#fbb;"
| 2013-11-16 || Lost ||align=left| Talaytong Sor. Thanapetch ||  || Bangkok, Thailand || Decision || 5 || 3:00
|-  style="background:#cfc;"
| 2013-10-12 || Win || style="text-align:left;"| Chanajon P.K. Saenchai Muaythaigym || Omnoi Stadium || Thailand || Decision || 5 || 3:00
|-  style="background:#cfc;"
| 2013-09-26 || Win || style="text-align:left;"| Wacharalek Or. Kwanmuang ||  || Thailand || Decision || 5 || 3:00
|-  style="background:#cfc;"
| 2013-08-23 || Win ||align=left| Sampson S. Sompong ||  || Thailand || Decision || 5 || 3:00 
|-  style="background:#cfc;"
| 2013-07-20 || Win ||align=left| Kwanchai Petchniroj ||  || Thailand || Decision || 5 || 3:00
|-  style="background:#fbb;"
| 2013-06-21 || Lost ||align=left| Djime Coulibaly || Best of Siam 4 || Paris, France || Decision  || 5 || 3:00
|-  style="background:#cfc;"
| 2013-04-12 || Win ||align=left| Manasak Kiatniwat ||  || Nakhon Ratchasima, Thailand || Decision  || 5 || 3:00
|-  style="background:#fbb;"
| 2013-03-29 || Win ||align=left| Dejrit Poptheeratham || Toyota Marathon || Kanchanaburi, Thailand || Decision  || 5 || 3:00
|-  style="background:#cfc;"
| 2013-03-29 || Win ||align=left| Saengchan Tor Manothammaraksa || Toyota Marathon || Kanchanaburi, Thailand || Decision  || 5 || 3:00
|-  style="background:#cfc;"
| 2013-02-23 || Win ||align=left| Paulo Santos || THAI FIGHT Extreme 2013: Muay Thai Day || Ayutthaya, Thailand || KO  || 1 ||
|-  style="background:#cfc;"
| 2013-01- || Win || style="text-align:left;"| Wacharalek Or. Kwanmuang || Omnoi Stadium || Thailand || Decision || 5 || 3:00
|-
| colspan=9 | Legend:

See also
List of male kickboxers

References

External links
Sitsongpeenong Muaythai Camp

1993 births
Living people
Lightweight kickboxers
Yodpayak Sitsongpeenong
Yodpayak Sitsongpeenong